Mahmoud Nuseir Youssef El-Gohary (20 February 1938 – 31 August 2012) was an Egyptian footballer and football coach.

Career
As a player, El-Gohary had a short-lived career. A persistent knee injury forced him into early retirement in 1961 cut short a career full of promise. In the 1959 African Cup of Nations, which Egypt won, he ended as the top scorer in the competition. He was also part of Egypt's squad for the 1960 Summer Olympics. After his retirement from the game, El-Gohary became a coach with Al Ahly, eventually becoming an assistant manager from 1965 to 1977.

In 1977, he became assistant manager to Dettmar Cramer at Al-Ittihad in Saudi Arabia. Cramer left Al-Ittihad at the end of the 1981 season and El-Gohary was promoted to manager. Al-Ittihad won their first ever Saudi Premier League and El-Gohary won the first of many trophies as a manager. At Al Ahly, he won the first African League Titles – African League Winners & African League Cup winners. With Zamalek, he won the first African Super Cup against Al-Ahli.

Under his leadership, Egypt’s National Team qualified for the World Cup in 1990, after the country's 56-year absence from the tournament. Under El-Gohary's management, the Jordanian national team reached the highest FIFA World Rankings in history when they reached 37th rank in August 2004. Under the leadership of El-Gohary, the Jordanian national team qualified for their first (AFC) Asian Football Confederation in China 2004. Jordan reached the quarterfinals of the tournament but failed to qualify for the semifinals after losing to Japan in a penalty shoot-out, resulting in a score of 1–1. In the West Asian Football Federation Championship Tournaments of 2004 and 2007, El-Gohary helped Jordan win third place.
 
After he retired as a football coach, he became the technical adviser for the Jordan Football Association. He transformed the Jordanian Football League to a professional body, and he has various Football Academies for youth placed under Prince Ali's name. He died on 31 August 2012, in Amman, Jordan.

References

External links
 BBC Sport profile
 Mahmoud El-Gohary Profile at egyptianfootball.net

1938 births
2012 deaths
Footballers from Cairo
Association football midfielders
Egyptian footballers
Al Ahly SC players
Egypt international footballers
1959 African Cup of Nations players
Footballers at the 1960 Summer Olympics
Olympic footballers of Egypt
Egyptian football managers
Egyptian expatriate football managers
Zamalek SC managers
Al Ahly SC managers
Egypt national football team managers
1990 FIFA World Cup managers
1999 FIFA Confederations Cup managers
2004 AFC Asian Cup managers
Jordan national football team managers
Al-Ahli Saudi FC managers
Ittihad FC managers
Africa Cup of Nations-winning players
1992 African Cup of Nations managers
1998 African Cup of Nations managers
2002 African Cup of Nations managers
Egyptian Premier League players